Mexico is an unincorporated community, in Crittenden County, Kentucky. It lies at an elevation of 495 feet (151 m).

References

Unincorporated communities in Kentucky
Unincorporated communities in Crittenden County, Kentucky